"The Horror of Howling Hill" is a 2008 BBC Books adventure book written by Jonathan Green and based on the long-running British science fiction television series Doctor Who. It features the Tenth Doctor and Martha.

This is part of the Decide Your Destiny series which makes the reader choose what happens.

Notes

2008 British novels
2008 science fiction novels
Decide Your Destiny gamebooks
Tenth Doctor novels
Books by Jonathan Green (speculative fiction writer)
BBC Books books